American pop rock band OneRepublic has released five studio albums, one live album, six extended plays, 32 singles, 10 promotional singles, and 28 music videos. Formed in 2002, OneRepublic first found commercial recognition when their song "Apologize" was released onto Myspace in 2005 and they subsequently became the biggest act on that site. It was remixed by American record producer Timbaland, appearing on his album Shock Value.  Released as a single in 2007, the song topped the charts in multiple countries, including Australia and Canada, while also reaching the top three in the United States and the United Kingdom. It has since sold over 3.6 million digital downloads in the United States. The band's debut studio album, Dreaming Out Loud, was released in November 2007. It hit the top ten on the albums charts of countries such as Australia, Canada and the United Kingdom. It also peaked at number 14 on the US Billboard 200, earning a gold certification from the Recording Industry Association of America (RIAA). The album's second single, "Stop and Stare", peaked at number 12 on the US Billboard Hot 100 while also reaching the top five in Austria and the United Kingdom. The album spawned three more singles: "Say (All I Need)", "Mercy", and "Come Home".

Waking Up, the band's second studio album, was released in November 2009. It peaked at number 21 on the Billboard 200, earning a gold certification from the RIAA. The album's lead single, "All the Right Moves", became a top ten hit in multiple countries, including Ireland and Switzerland. It also peaked at number 18 on the Billboard Hot 100. "Secrets", the album's second single, peaked at number 21 on the Hot 100. "Marchin On" was released as the album's third single in Europe, becoming a top ten hit in Austria and Germany. "Good Life", the album's fourth single, became the band's second top ten hit on the Billboard Hot 100, where it peaked at number 8. It also peaked at number 5 on the Canadian Hot 100.

Native, the band's third album, was released in March 2013. The album peaked at number 4 on the Billboard 200, earning a gold certification and becoming the band's highest-charting album to date. The album contains the worldwide hit "Counting Stars", which topped the charts in Canada and the United Kingdom and reached number 2 in the United States and several other countries, as well as the moderately successful singles "Feel Again", "Something I Need" and "If I Lose Myself". In 2014, there was a reissue of that album, which contained a new single, "Love Runs Out", which peaked at number 15 on the Billboard Hot 100 chart, included a dance remix of the song "If I Lose Myself" by Alesso.

Oh My My, OneRepublic's fourth album, was released on October 7, 2016. The first single from the album, "Wherever I Go", reached number 55 on the Billboard Hot 100. The second single, "Kids", reached number 96 on the Hot 100. The band released their fifth album, Human, on August 27, 2021.

Albums

Studio albums

Live albums

Extended plays

Singles

As lead artist

As featured artist

Promotional singles

Other charted songs

Guest appearances

Music videos

Notes

References

External links
 Official website
 OneRepublic at AllMusic
 
 

Discographies of American artists
Discography
Pop music group discographies
Rock music group discographies